The Money Store is the debut studio album by American experimental hip hop trio Death Grips. It is the follow-up to their debut mixtape, Exmilitary. The album was officially released on April 24, 2012, but had been leaked to YouTube on April 14, sold by the band at Coachella on cassette on April 20, and made available on vinyl on April 21 to celebrate Record Store Day. The Money Store was announced alongside the group's second album, No Love Deep Web, which was released later in the year.

Background
The album was first hinted at with the release of a music video for a track titled "Blackjack" on February 7, 2012. The album was later announced along with the release of another track titled "Get Got" on February 27. It was then announced that Death Grips had signed to Epic Records and were scheduled to release two albums in 2012. On February 28, the group posted both songs online for free.

On March 2, a video surfaced on their official YouTube channel of the band practising a new track titled "Lost Boys", to be released on The Money Store. The studio version was then posted to their YouTube channel on March 13, and was later released for free download on their website. On March 27, they released the music video for the song "The Fever (Aye Aye)", followed by a free download.

On April 10, the song "I've Seen Footage" was released for free download on their official SoundCloud page. Pitchfork Media awarded the track their "Best New Music" designation. The album was leaked on April 14, and the band uploaded a complete version to their YouTube channel and SoundCloud account. The following day, Pitchfork Media posted "Hacker", the album's closing track, and named it "Best New Music".

On May 4, Death Grips announced via Facebook that they had cancelled their upcoming tour dates in support of The Money Store in order to finish the recording of their second record, No Love Deep Web, stating "[sic] we are dropping out to complete our next album NO LOVE. see you when it's done. (there are no longer any scheduled shows)".

On September 10, a song titled "@DeathGripz", named after their Twitter username, was released as the final installment of the Adult Swim Singles Program 2012. The group had stated earlier that it was an unreleased cut from The Money Store.

In interviews, Death Grips said that much of their music is created by sampling. They have said that they carry video cameras and tape recorders wherever they go and use samples from their experiences.

Elements of the track "System Blower" and "Full Moon (Death Classic)" were used on the band's remix of "Sacrifice" by Björk, which she included on her 2012 remix album Bastards later that year.

The closing track "Hacker" is believed to be an outtake from the band's debut 2011 mixtape Exmilitary. The file for an early unreleased version of the song was leaked on the band's official Subreddit in April 2017, originally titled "Earth Angel (Androgynous Mind)".

Artwork
The album cover depicts a voluptuous masochist with "Death Grips" carved into their chest on the leash of a smoking female sadist. The image is painted by Sua Yoo, an artist with whom Death Grips had worked in the past. They later appeared on the album art for the band's 2015 soundtrack album, Fashion Week. It originally appeared in a zine, but the band name carved into the submissive's chest was added afterwards. The non-explicit variant of the album cover includes a white bar with the album name printed across it, censoring the breasts.

Reception

The Money Store received critical acclaim upon release. Music journalist Jim Carroll summarized: "MC Ride, Andy Morin and Zach Hill set out to create an intense, spectacular, feral racket and succeed in spades. Once you get used to the fact that they're fuming, you'll thrill to the raw, fractured, incessant and apocalyptic barrage of noise as Death Grips prepare for the end of the world."

Jayson Greene of Pitchfork assigned the album a "Best New Music" label and wrote that "The Money Store is about as intellectual an experience as a scraped knee. But it's just as good at reminding you that you're alive."

The album also notably received a "10" from music critic Anthony Fantano, the first of only seven albums to have ever received a perfect score from him as of September 2021.

Spin, while very positive towards The Money Store, felt it was inferior to Exmilitary for the rejection of the mixtape's use of samples, specifically "the raw, imperfect way that samples rub up against one another." Less satisfied reviewers included Louis Pattison of NME, who felt its "utterly convincing" dystopian vision was ruined by an "alienating" presentation of themes that lacked a goal; The Guardians Alex Macpherson, who claimed Burnett's "one-note" vocal performance distracted the listener from the instrumentals' "careening thrill;" and Sputnikmusic, who panned the "poor taste" blend of genres and production elements and "MC Ride's consistently incoherent mumbling and meme-of-the-day approach to making hooks" that muddled the record's lyrical complexities.

Accolades

Track listing

Personnel
Death Grips
 MC Ride – vocals
 Zach Hill – drums, percussion, production
 Andy Morin – keyboards, programming, production

Charts

Release history

References

External links
 

2012 debut albums
Death Grips albums
Epic Records albums